Frank Moser and David Škoch were the defending champions but decided not to participate.
Federico Delbonis and Renzo Olivo won the final against Martín Alund and Facundo Argüello 6–1, 6–4.

Seeds

Draw

Draw

References
 Main Draw

Citta di Como Challenger - Doubles
Città di Como Challenger